Richard I (28 August 932 – 20 November 996), also known as Richard the Fearless (French: Richard Sans-Peur; Old Norse: Jarl Rikard), was the count of Rouen from 942 to 996. Dudo of Saint-Quentin, whom Richard commissioned to write the "De moribus et actis primorum Normanniae ducum" (Latin, "On the Customs and Deeds of the First Dukes of Normandy"), called him a dux. However, this use of the word may have been in the context of Richard's renowned leadership in war, and not as a reference to a title of nobility. Richard either introduced feudalism into Normandy or he greatly expanded it. By the end of his reign, the most important Norman landholders held their lands in feudal tenure.

Birth
Richard was born to William Longsword, princeps (chieftain or ruler) of Normandy, and Sprota, a Breton concubine captured in war and bound to William by a more danico marriage. He was also the grandson of the famous Rollo. William was told of the birth of a son after the battle with Riouf and other Viking rebels, but his existence was kept secret until a few years later when William Longsword first met his son Richard. After kissing the boy and declaring him his heir, William sent Richard to be raised in Bayeux. Richard was about ten years old when his father was killed on 17 December 942. After William was killed, Sprota became the wife of Esperleng, a wealthy miller. Rodulf of Ivry was their son and Richard's half-brother.

Life

With the death of Richard's father in 942, King Louis IV of France installed the boy, Richard, in his father's office. Under the influence of Arnulf I, Count of Flanders, the king took him into Frankish territory and placing him in the custody of the count of Ponthieu before the king reneged and seized the lands of the Duchy of Normandy. He then split up the duchy, giving its lands in lower Normandy to Hugh the Great. Louis IV thereafter kept Richard in close confinement at Lâon, Upon hearing that Richard was being held in captivity, the boy's foster Osmond de Centville alongside Bernard the Dane had formed a mob of knights and peasants across town and marched to the King's palace where they threatened the king to return him. Louis had protested that he had kept Richard in his domain to train him in courtliness. He subsequently addresses the mob by holding Richard up in his arms into the crowd's view and returning him. Bernard de Senlis and Ivo de Bellèsme also assisted in Richard's release, along with pagan Norse forces led by Harald of Bayeux.

In 946, at the age of 14, Richard allied himself with the Norman and Viking leaders in France and with men sent by King Harold of Denmark. A battle was fought after which Louis IV was captured. Hostages were taken and held until King Louis recognised Richard as Duke, returning Normandy to him. Richard agreed to "commend" himself to Hugh, the Count of Paris, Hugh resolved to form a permanent alliance with Richard and promised his daughter Emma, who was little more than a girl, as a bride; the marriage would take place in 960.

Louis, working with Arnulf, persuaded Otto I, Holy Roman Emperor to attack Richard and Hugh. The combined armies of Otto, Arnulf, and Louis were driven from the gates of Rouen, fleeing to Amiens and being decisively defeated in 947. A period of peace ensued, Louis dying in 954, 13 year old Lothair becoming king. The middle-aged Hugh appointed Richard as guardian of his 15-year-old son, Hugh Capet in 955.

In 962, Theobald I, Count of Blois, attempted a renewed invasion of Rouen, Richard's stronghold, but his troops were summarily routed by Normans under Richard's command, and forced to retreat before ever having crossed the Seine river. Lothair, the king of the West Franks, was fearful that Richard's retaliation could destabilize a large part of West Francia so he stepped in to prevent any further war between the two. In 987, Hugh Capet became King of the Franks.

For the last 30 years until his death in 996 in Fécamp, Richard concentrated on Normandy itself, and participated less in Frankish politics and its petty wars. In lieu of building up the Norman Empire by expansion, he stabilized the realm and reunited the Normans, forging the reclaimed Duchy of his father and grandfather into West Francia's most cohesive and formidable principality.

Richard died of natural causes in Fecamp, France, on 20 November 996.

It was reported that the remains in his grave were not his.

Relationships with France, England and the Church
Richard used marriage to build strong alliances. His marriage to Emma of Paris connected him directly to the House of Capet. His second wife, Gunnor, from a rival Viking group in the Cotentin, formed an alliance to that group, while her sisters formed the core group that were to provide loyal followers to him and his successors.

His daughters forged valuable marriage alliances with powerful neighboring counts as well as to the king of England. Emma married firstly Æthelred the Unready and after his death in 1016, the invader, Cnut the Great. Her children included Edward the Confessor, Alfred Aetheling and with Cnut, Harthacnut, so completing a major link between the Duke of Normandy and the Crown of England that would add validity to the claim by William the Conqueror to the throne of England.

Richard also built on his relationship with the church, undertaking acts of piety, restoring their lands and ensuring the great monasteries flourished in Normandy. His further reign was marked by an extended period of peace and tranquility.

Marriages and issue

Richard's first marriage in 960 was to Emma, daughter of Hugh the Great, and Hedwige of Saxony. They were betrothed when both were very young. She died after 19 March 968, with no issue.

According to Robert of Torigni, not long after Emma's death, Duke Richard went out hunting and stopped at the house of a local forester. He became enamored with the forester's wife, Seinfreda, but she was a virtuous woman and suggested he court her unmarried sister, Gunnor, instead. Gunnor became his mistress and her family rose to prominence. Her brother, Herfast de Crepon, may have been involved in a controversial heresy trial. Gunnor was, like Richard, of Viking descent, being part Danish by blood. Richard finally married her to legitimize their children:

 Richard II "the Good", Duke of Normandy
 Robert, Archbishop of Rouen, Count of Evreux 
 Mauger, Count of Corbeil
 another son
 Emma of Normandy, wife of two kings of England, mother of two kings of England, and step-mother of another two kings of England
 Maud of Normandy, wife of Odo II of Blois, Count of Blois, Champagne and Chartres
 Hawise of Normandy m. Geoffrey I, Duke of Brittany

Illegitimate children
Richard was known to have had several other mistresses and had children with many of them.  Known children are:

 Geoffrey, Count of Eu
 William, Count of Eu (ca. 972 – 26 January 1057 or 58), m. Lasceline de Turqueville (d. 26 January 1057 or 1058).
 Beatrice of Normandy, Abbess of Montivilliers d.1034 m. Ebles of Turenne (d.1030 (divorced)

Possible children
 Muriella, married Tancred de Hauteville
 Fressenda or Fredesenda (ca. 995-ca. 1057), second wife of Tancred de Hauteville.
 Guimara (Wimarc(a)) (b. ca. 986), died Montivilliers Abbey, Seine-Inferieure, Normandy, wife of Ansfred (Ansfroi) II "le Dane" le Goz, vicomte of Exmes and Falaise, mother of Robert FitzWimarc
 Papia

Notes

References

External links
The Henry Project: Richard I of Normandy

932 births
996 deaths
10th-century Dukes of Normandy
Norman warriors
People from Fécamp
Dukes of Normandy
Medieval child monarchs
10th-century rulers in Europe
10th-century Normans
House of Normandy